Sir George Rivers Lowndes, KCSI, KC (1862–1943), was an Anglo-Indian lawyer and judge.

Lowndes was the son of Reverend Richard Lowndes Vicar of Sturminster & his wife Ann Harriet née Kaye. He married Hilda Julia Forbes on the 3rd of Sept. 1896 at Sturminster, Dorset. Their eldest son Richard Forbes Lowndes was killed aged 19 on the 14th Nov 1916 at the Somme, France.

He practised before the High Court of Bombay.  Upon his return to the United Kingdom, he was appointed to the Judicial Committee of the Privy Council in 1929, at that time the court of last resort for the British Empire.  He retired from the Judicial Committee in 1934, being replaced by Sir Lancelot Sanderson, a former Chief Justice of the High Court of Calcutta.

References 

British King's Counsel
Knights Commander of the Order of the Star of India
Members of the Judicial Committee of the Privy Council
1862 births
1943 deaths
British people in colonial India
Members of the Privy Council of the United Kingdom